Kovilur is a village in the Ariyalur taluk of Ariyalur district, Tamil Nadu, India.

Demographics 

 census, Kovilur had a total population of 2,867 with 1,471 males and 1,396 females.

References 

Villages in Ariyalur district